Waltz Time is a 1945 British musical film directed by Paul L. Stein and starring Carol Raye, Peter Graves and Patricia Medina.

Premise
In Imperial Vienna a young Grand Duchess is prevented from marrying the man she loves.

Partial cast

Reception
According to Kinematograph Weekly the film performed well at the British box office in 1945. The 'biggest winner' at the box office in 1945 Britain was The Seventh Veil, with "runners up" being (in release order), Madonna of the Seven Moons, Old Acquaintance, Frenchman's Creek, Mrs Parkington, Arsenic and Old Lace, Meet Me in St Louis, A Song to Remember, Since You Went Away, Here Come the Waves, Tonight and Every Night, Hollywood Canteen, They Were Sisters, The Princess and the Pirate, The Adventures of Susan, National Velvet, Mrs Skefflington, I Live in Grosvenor Square, Nob Hill, Perfect Strangers, Valley of Decision, Conflict and Duffy's Tavern. British "runners up" were They Were Sisters, I Live in Grosvenor Square, Perfect Strangers, Madonna of the Seven Moons, Waterloo Road, Blithe Spirit, The Way to the Stars, I'll Be Your Sweetheart, Dead of Night, Waltz Time and Henry V.

References

External links

Review of film at Variety

1945 films
1940s historical musical films
British historical musical films
Films directed by Paul L. Stein
Films set in Vienna
British black-and-white films
Films with screenplays by Jack Whittingham
Films shot at British National Studios
1940s English-language films
1940s British films